Noah Miller Ludlow (1795–1886), was an American actor and theatre manager.  He was the leader of a theatre company touring Louisiana (where he introduced English language theatre) and Alabama and Mississippi, where he introduced theatre. 

In New Orleans, Ludlow made his career by performing "The Hunters of Kentucky", a sing written at the end of the war to celebrate the Battle of New Orleans.

References

1795 births
1886 deaths
19th-century American male actors
American male stage actors
19th-century theatre managers